The 1989–90 NBA season was the 21st season for the Phoenix Suns in the National Basketball Association.record. Cotton Fitzsimmons was head coach for a club that returned to the Western Conference Finals. All home games were played at Arizona Veterans Memorial Coliseum. In December, the team traded Armen Gilliam to the Charlotte Hornets in exchange for Kurt Rambis, who won four championships with the Los Angeles Lakers. The Suns held a 28–17 record at the All-Star break, and finished third in the Pacific Division with a 54–28 record.

Tom Chambers averaged 27.2 points and 7.0 rebounds per game, while last season's Most Improved Player, Kevin Johnson averaged 22.5 points and 11.4 assists per game. Chambers and Johnson were both selected for the 1990 NBA All-Star Game, which was Johnson's first All-Star selection, and were both named to the All-NBA Second Team at season's end. In addition, Jeff Hornacek provided the team with 17.6 points, 5.0 assists and 1.7 steals per game, while sixth man Eddie Johnson provided with 16.9 points per game off the bench, second-year guard Dan Majerle contributed 11.1 points, 5.9 rebounds and 1.4 steals per game also off the bench, and Mark West averaged 10.5 points, 8.9 rebounds and 2.2 blocks per game.

In the Western Conference First Round of the playoffs, the Suns lost Game 1 to the 4th-seeded Utah Jazz, but managed to defeat them in five games. In the Western Conference Semi-finals, they upset Magic Johnson and the top-seeded Los Angeles Lakers in five games, but lost to the Portland Trail Blazers four games to two in the Western Conference Finals. The Blazers would lose to the defending champion Detroit Pistons in five games in the NBA Finals.

The season was also highlighted by Chambers setting a franchise record for points scored in one game, when on February 18, 1990, he scored 56 points in a 131–113 road win over the Golden State Warriors. Just over a month later, he would break his own record when he scored 60 against his former team, the Seattle SuperSonics on March 24, 1990, which the Suns won at home, 121–95. Chamber's record would be broken by Devin Booker on March 24th 2017 by scoring 70 points against the Boston Celtics.

NBA Draft

The Suns traded first-round pick Anthony Cook on draft night to the Detroit Pistons for 27th pick Kenny Battle and Micheal Williams. Battle played for a season and a half before being waived in January 1991. Micheal Williams would play six games for the Suns before being waived. The Suns received the 46th pick (Ricky Blanton) from the Chicago Bulls when they traded Craig Hodges for Ed Nealy. Blanton, after knee surgery, sat on the bench for the 89–90 season, and was waived shortly after the start of the 90–91 season. Mike Morrison played sparingly in the 89–90 season, and was traded before the start of the 90–91 season. Greg Grant played the season as a backup to Kevin Johnson, before being released in the 1990 offseason.

Roster

Regular season

Standings

Record vs. opponents

Playoffs
The Suns entered the postseason as the fifth seed in the Western Conference, opening the playoffs against the fourth-seeded Utah Jazz. With stomach flu limiting All-Star point guard Kevin Johnson to only 9 minutes, the Jazz took game one with a 17-point victory in Salt Lake City. Johnson returned for game two, leading the Suns to an 18-point victory. After splitting two games in Phoenix, the Suns headed back to Salt Lake for the decisive fifth game. Kevin Johnson sealed the game with a last-second jump shot to give the Suns a 104–102 victory.

The Suns would next face-off against the top-seeded Los Angeles Lakers, who finished the season with a league-best 63–19 record. Coach Cotton Fitzsimmons came into game one with an 0–37 record coaching against the Lakers at the Great Western Forum. The Suns had lost 21 consecutive games at the Forum dating back to 1984. They ended the streak with a 104–102 upset, stealing homecourt advantage. Center Mark West led the Suns with 24 points, 16 rebounds and 7 blocks. The Lakers would recover in game two, blowing out the Suns 100–124 to even the series. After winning games three and four in Phoenix, the Suns returned to the Forum with a 3–1 series lead. Despite an early 15-point lead and a 43-point performance from MVP Magic Johnson, the Suns rallied to a 106–103 victory, behind 37 points from Kevin Johnson.

The Suns headed to the Western Conference Finals to face the Portland Trail Blazers. Looking to steal homecourt advantage for the third straight series, the Suns fell 98–100 in a closely contested game one. A last second shot from reserve shooting guard Mike McGee was blocked by Blazers guard Danny Young. Game two saw the Suns run to a 22-point lead in the second quarter, finishing the first half leading 59–41. The Blazers launched a furious second-half comeback, tying the game 106–106 after a Terry Porter three-pointer with 28 seconds left. Kevin Johnson was immediately fouled, missing the first free throw and making the second to give the Suns a one-point lead. Porter would give the Blazers the lead after a 14-foot jump shot with 12 seconds left. Suns forward Eddie Johnson missed a 20-foot jumper with 4 seconds left, giving the Blazers a 108–107 victory. The Suns would beat the Blazers by 34 and 12 in games three and four in Phoenix, before the Blazers retook the series lead with a 6-point victory in game five. Fortune turned against the Suns in game six, when Kevin Johnson went down with a hamstring injury at the end of the second quarter. Shooting guard Jeff Hornacek led the team in Johnson's absence, scoring a career playoff high 36 points. The Suns led 109–108 with 55 seconds left in the game. Blazers forward Jerome Kersey blocked a shot by Hornacek and scored a fast-break layup, giving the Blazers a 110–109 lead with 27 seconds left. Looking to regain the lead, Suns forward Tom Chambers had the ball stripped by Buck Williams. Star Clyde Drexler would make two free-throws to put the Blazers up 112–109. Hornacek missed a last-second three-pointer, ending the Suns unlikely playoff run.

Game log

|- align="center" bgcolor="#ffcccc"
| 1
| April 27
| @ Utah
| L 96–113
| Dan Majerle (23)
| Kurt Rambis (9)
| Jeff Hornacek (6)
| Salt Palace12,616
| 0–1
|- align="center" bgcolor="#ccffcc"
| 2
| April 29
| @ Utah
| W 105–87
| Kevin Johnson (22)
| Mark West (21)
| Kevin Johnson (7)
| Salt Palace12,616
| 1–1
|- align="center" bgcolor="#ccffcc"
| 3
| May 2
| Utah
| W 120–105
| Kevin Johnson (29)
| Mark West (10)
| Kevin Johnson (12)
| Arizona Veterans Memorial Coliseum14,487
| 2–1
|- align="center" bgcolor="#ffcccc"
| 4
| May 4
| Utah
| L 94–105
| Eddie Johnson (33)
| Mark West (11)
| Kevin Johnson (13)
| Arizona Veterans Memorial Coliseum14,487
| 2–2
|- align="center" bgcolor="#ccffcc"
| 5
| May 6
| @ Utah
| W 104–102
| Tom Chambers (32)
| Mark West (11)
| Kevin Johnson (9)
| Salt Palace12,616
| 3–2

|- align="center" bgcolor="#ccffcc"
| 1
| May 8
| @ L.A. Lakers
| W 104–102
| Tom Chambers (26)
| Mark West (16)
| Kevin Johnson (12)
| Great Western Forum17,505
| 1–0
|- align="center" bgcolor="#ffcccc"
| 2
| May 10
| @ L.A. Lakers
| L 100–124
| Jeff Hornacek (18)
| five players tied (5)
| Kevin Johnson (12)
| Great Western Forum17,505
| 1–1
|- align="center" bgcolor="#ccffcc"
| 3
| May 12
| L.A. Lakers
| W 117–103
| Tom Chambers (34)
| Chambers, K. Johnson (7)
| Kevin Johnson (8)
| Arizona Veterans Memorial Coliseum14,487
| 2–1
|- align="center" bgcolor="#ccffcc"
| 4
| May 13
| L.A. Lakers
| W 114–101
| Kevin Johnson (30)
| Mark West (15)
| Kevin Johnson (16)
| Arizona Veterans Memorial Coliseum14,487
| 3–1
|- align="center" bgcolor="#ccffcc"
| 5
| May 15
| @ L.A. Lakers
| W 106–103
| Kevin Johnson (37)
| Mark West (16)
| Kevin Johnson (8)
| Great Western Forum17,505
| 4–1

|- align="center" bgcolor="#ffcccc"
| 1
| May 21
| @ Portland
| L 98–100
| Tom Chambers (29)
| Mark West (12)
| Kevin Johnson (11)
| Memorial Coliseum12,884
| 0–1
|- align="center" bgcolor="#ffcccc"
| 2
| May 23
| @ Portland
| L 107–108
| Tom Chambers (28)
| Tom Chambers (14)
| Kevin Johnson (8)
| Memorial Coliseum12,884
| 0–2
|- align="center" bgcolor="#ccffcc"
| 3
| May 25
| Portland
| W 123–89
| Tom Chambers (24)
| Andrew Lang (10)
| Kevin Johnson (12)
| Arizona Veterans Memorial Coliseum14,487
| 1–2
|- align="center" bgcolor="#ccffcc"
| 4
| May 27
| Portland
| W 119–107
| Kevin Johnson (28)
| Mark West (12)
| Kevin Johnson (17)
| Arizona Veterans Memorial Coliseum14,487
| 2–2
|- align="center" bgcolor="#ffcccc"
| 5
| May 29
| @ Portland
| L 114–120
| Kevin Johnson (28)
| Tom Chambers (13)
| Kevin Johnson (14)
| Memorial Coliseum12,884
| 2–3
|- align="center" bgcolor="#ffcccc"
| 6
| May 31
| Portland
| L 109–112
| Jeff Hornacek (36)
| Kurt Rambis (12)
| Hornacek, K. Johnson (6)
| Arizona Veterans Memorial Coliseum14,487
| 2–4
|-

Player statistics

Season

|- align="center" bgcolor=""
|  || 59 || 8 || 12.4 || .547 || .250 || .671 || 2.1 || 0.6 || .6 || .2 || 4.1
|- align="center" bgcolor="#f0f0f0"
|  || 81 || style="background:#FF8800;color:#423189;" | 81 || style="background:#FF8800;color:#423189;" | 37.6 || .501 || .279 || .861 || 7.0 || 2.3 || 1.1 || .6 || style="background:#FF8800;color:#423189;" | 27.2
|- align="center" bgcolor=""
| * || 16 || 7 || 16.7 || .430 || . || .696 || 4.4 || 0.5 || .4 || .3 || 8.9
|- align="center" bgcolor="#f0f0f0"
|  || 67 || 3 || 10.1 || .384 || .188 || .661 || 0.9 || 2.5 || .5 || .0 || 3.1
|- align="center" bgcolor=""
|  || 67 || 60 || 34.0 || .536 || style="background:#FF8800;color:#423189;" | .408† || .856 || 4.7 || 5.0 || style="background:#FF8800;color:#423189;" | 1.7 || .2 || 17.6
|- align="center" bgcolor="#f0f0f0"
|  || 64 || 4 || 28.3 || .453 || .380 || style="background:#FF8800;color:#423189;" | .917^ || 3.8 || 1.7 || .5 || .2 || 16.9
|- align="center" bgcolor=""
|  || 74 || 74 || 37.6 || .499 || .195 || .838 || 3.6 || style="background:#FF8800;color:#423189;" | 11.4 || 1.3 || .2 || 22.5
|- align="center" bgcolor="#f0f0f0"
|  || 74 || 0 || 13.7 || .557 || . || .653 || 3.7 || 0.3 || .3 || 1.8 || 3.5
|- align="center" bgcolor=""
|  || 11 || 0 || 7.5 || .379 || .000 || 1.000^ || 0.7 || 0.5 || .2 || .0 || 2.5
|- align="center" bgcolor="#f0f0f0"
|  || 73 || 23 || 30.7 || .424 || .238 || .762 || 5.9 || 2.6 || 1.4 || .4 || 11.1
|- align="center" bgcolor=""
|  || 14 || 7 || 20.0 || .483 || .348 || .476 || 2.6 || 1.1 || .6 || .1 || 7.3
|- align="center" bgcolor="#f0f0f0"
|  || 36 || 1 || 4.3 || .338 || .286 || .800 || 0.6 || 0.3 || .1 || .0 || 2.0
|- align="center" bgcolor=""
|  || 60 || 18 || 10.2 || .513 || 1.000† || .589 || 2.5 || 0.3 || .4 || .4 || 4.2
|- align="center" bgcolor="#f0f0f0"
| * || 58 || 45 || 25.1 || .514 || .000 || .722 || 7.0 || 1.8 || 1.2 || .5 || 5.4
|- align="center" bgcolor=""
|  || style="background:#FF8800;color:#423189;" | 82 || 79 || 29.3 || style="background:#FF8800;color:#423189;" | .625 || . || .691 || style="background:#FF8800;color:#423189;" | 8.9 || 0.5 || .4 || style="background:#FF8800;color:#423189;" | 2.2 || 10.5
|- align="center" bgcolor="#f0f0f0"
| * || 6 || 0 || 4.3 || .200 || . || .500 || 0.2 || 0.7 || .0 || .0 || 0.8
|}
* – Stats with the Suns.
† – Minimum 25 three-pointers made.
^ – Minimum 125 free throws made.

Playoffs

|- align="center" bgcolor=""
|  || 8 ||  || 4.3 || .308 || . || style="background:#FF8800;color:#423189;" | 1.000 || 0.6 || 0.0 || .0 || .0 || 1.1
|- align="center" bgcolor="#f0f0f0"
|  || style="background:#FF8800;color:#423189;" | 16 || || style="background:#FF8800;color:#423189;" | 38.3 || .425 || .263 || .879 || 6.7 || 1.9 || .4 || .4 || style="background:#FF8800;color:#423189;" | 22.2
|- align="center" bgcolor=""
|  || 7 ||  || 6.7 || .450 || .333 || . || 0.9 || 1.4 || .3 || .0 || 1.4
|- align="center" bgcolor="f0f0f0"
|  || style="background:#FF8800;color:#423189;" | 16 || || 36.4 || .511 || .250 || .932 || 3.9 || 4.6 || 1.5 || .0 || 18.6
|- align="center" bgcolor=""
|  || style="background:#FF8800;color:#423189;" | 16 || || 21.1 || .450 || .395 || .787 || 3.6 || 1.1 || .6 || .2 || 12.3
|- align="center" bgcolor="#f0f0f0"
|  || style="background:#FF8800;color:#423189;" | 16 || || 36.4 || .479 || .182 || .821 || 3.3 || style="background:#FF8800;color:#423189;" | 10.6 || style="background:#FF8800;color:#423189;" | 1.6 || .0 || 21.3
|- align="center" bgcolor=""
|  || 12 || || 7.8 || style="background:#FF8800;color:#423189;" | .667 || . || .571 || 1.7 || 0.2 || .2 || .8 || 1.3
|- align="center" bgcolor="#f0f0f0"
|  || style="background:#FF8800;color:#423189;" | 16 || || 29.9 || .487 || .333 || .785 || 5.1 || 2.1 || 1.2 || .1 || 12.6
|- align="center" bgcolor=""
|  || 10 || || 4.4 || .350 || style="background:#FF8800;color:#423189;" | .429 || .250 || 0.4 || 0.2 || .1 || .1 || 1.8
|- align="center" bgcolor="#f0f0f0"
|  || 11 || || 9.1 || .520 || . || .444 || 1.9 || 0.2 || .3 || .5 || 3.1
|- align="center" bgcolor=""
|  || style="background:#FF8800;color:#423189;" | 16 || || 24.1 || .444 || .000 || .679 || 7.7 || 1.4 || .5 || .5 || 4.2
|- align="center" bgcolor="#f0f0f0"
|  || style="background:#FF8800;color:#423189;" | 16 || || 34.0 || .577 || . || .540 || style="background:#FF8800;color:#423189;" | 10.3 || 0.3 || .2 || style="background:#FF8800;color:#423189;" | 2.6 || 11.1
|}

Awards and honors

Week/Month
 Tom Chambers was named Player of the Week for games played February 5 through February 18.
 Kevin Johnson was named Player of the Week for games played March 12 through March 18.

All-Star
 Tom Chambers was selected as a reserve for the Western Conference in the All-Star Game. Chambers finished 9th in voting among Western Conference forwards with 64,028 votes.
 Kevin Johnson was selected as a reserve for the Western Conference in the All-Star Game. Johnson finished 6th in voting among Western Conference guards with 78,812 votes.

Season
 Tom Chambers was named to the All-NBA Second Team. Chambers finished 8th in MVP voting.
 Kevin Johnson was named to the All-NBA Second Team.
 Eddie Johnson finished 3rd in Sixth Man of the Year voting. He won the award the previous year in the 1988–89 season.
 Mark West led the league in field goal percentage, making .625% of his shots.

Transactions

Trades

Free agents

Additions

Subtractions

Player Transactions Citation:

References

 Standings on Basketball Reference

Phoenix Suns seasons